Harry Franklin Sallee (February 3, 1885 – March 23, 1950) was a professional baseball player. He was a left-handed pitcher over parts of fourteen seasons (1908–1921) with the St. Louis Cardinals, New York Giants and Cincinnati Reds. For his career, he compiled a 174–143 record in 476 appearances, with a 2.56 earned run average and 836 strikeouts. In Cardinals' franchise history, Sallee ranks 3rd all-time in earned run average (2.67), 7th in innings pitched (1905.1), 8th in games started (215) and wins (106, tied with Adam Wainwright), and 7th in losses (107).

Sallee pitched in two World Series, both against the Chicago White Sox, and was a member of the victorious Reds in the infamous "Black Sox" 1919 World Series. He produced the best season of his career for the 1919 Reds, going 21–7 with a 2.06 earned run average. He lost a World Series to the White Sox as a member of the 1917 Giants, starting Game 1 and losing 2-1 to Sox ace Eddie Cicotte in Chicago, driving in his team's only run. In World Series play, Sallee compiled a 1–3 record in four appearances, with a 3.45 earned run average and six strikeouts. Also in 1919, Sallee became just the second pitcher (at that time) to have more wins than walks in a season. Christy Mathewson did it twice (1913, 1914) and Bret Saberhagen accomplished this feat in 1994 with the New York Mets.

Sallee was born and later died in Higginsport, Ohio, at the age of 65. He was buried at Confidence Cemetery in Georgetown, Ohio.

See also
 List of St. Louis Cardinals team records
 List of Major League Baseball annual saves leaders

References
, or SABR Biography Project

1885 births
1950 deaths
Major League Baseball pitchers
Baseball players from Ohio
St. Louis Cardinals players
New York Giants (NL) players
Cincinnati Reds players
People from Brown County, Ohio
Birmingham Barons players
Toledo Mud Hens players
Williamsport Millionaires players
Meridian Ribboners players